Tough Love is an American reality television series that airs on VH1 and premiered on March 15, 2009. The host and matchmaker of the show is Steven Ward of the Philadelphia-based Master Matchmakers. Steven Ward's mother, JoAnn Ward, offers relationship advice.

Season 1

The first season premiered on March 15, 2009, and featured eight women seeking relationship help.

Season 2

The second season premiered on November 15, 2009, and featured nine women seeking relationship help.

Season 3

The third season was announced before the second season had completed. It was the first season to include couples, and premiered April 12, 2010.

Season 4

Season 4 of Tough Love Miami premiered on October 2, 2011.

Season 5

Season 5 of Tough Love was set in New Orleans and premiered in summer 2012

Season 6

Season 6 features both guys and girls.

References

External links

2000s American reality television series
2010s American reality television series
2009 American television series debuts
2013 American television series endings
English-language television shows
American dating and relationship reality television series
VH1 original programming